Castle is Sherman Chung's second album, released by EEG Emperor Entertainment Group in 2008.

Track listing
CD
 扭曲 (Niŭqū; Twisted)
 我的青春幽靈 (Wŏ de Qīngchūn Yōulíng; My Teen Spirit)
 堡壘 (Băolĕi; Castle)
 請你合作 (Qĭng Nĭ Hézuò; Please Cooperate)
 I Don't Care
 億萬少女 (Yì Wàn Shào Nǚ; Billionaire Girl)
 陽光小小姐 (Yángguāng Xiăoxiăo Jie; Little Miss Sunshine)
 紅茶易冷 (Hóng Chá Yìlĕng; Chilling Red Tea)
 剛剛好 (Gānggang Hăo; Just Fine)
 扶手電梯 (Fúshŏu Diàntī; Escalator)

DVD
The CD+DVD edition includes a DVD with four music videos:
 扭曲 (Niŭqū; Twisted)
 堡壘 (Băolĕi; Castle)
 請你合作 (Qĭng Nĭ Hézuò; Please Cooperate)
 陽光小小姐 (Yángguāng Xiăoxiăo Jie; Little Miss Sunshine)

References

2008 albums
Sherman Chung albums